The Chấn line (Hán tự: 支震; chi can also be translated to as branch) was the fourth dynasty of Hùng kings of the Hồng Bàng period of Văn Lang (now Vietnam). Starting approximately 2252 B.C., the line refers to the rule of Bửu Lang and his successors, when the seat of government was centered at Phú Thọ.

History
Bửu Lang (year of birth unknown) took the regnal name of Hùng Diệp Vương (雄曄王) upon becoming Hùng king. The series of all Hùng kings following Bửu Lang took that same regnal name of Hùng Diệp Vương to rule over Văn Lang until approximately 1913 B.C.

The burial customs of this period were that the bodies lay straight. But a sick deceased was usually laid to rest curled in the fetal position.

The evidence for early Vietnamese calendar system was recorded on stone tools dating back 2200-2000 BC. Parallel lines were carved on the stone tools as a counting instrument involving the lunar calendar.

Sometimes around 2000 B.C., the Phùng Nguyên culture arose and lasted about 1000 years. At the end of its time, it must have overlapped with the cultures of the later period.

Also during this time, population from the mountainous areas moved out and began to settle in the open along the rivers to join the agricultural activities. The slash-and-burn method was introduced to create fields. In addition, the population started to raise their own animals. Archaeologists had discovered the remains of domesticated animals.

References

Bibliography
Nguyen Ba Khoach (1978). "Phung Nguyen". ScholarSpace - University of Hawaii.
Nguyễn Khắc Thuần (2008). Thế thứ các triều vua Việt Nam. Giáo Dục Publisher.

Ancient peoples
Hồng Bàng dynasty
20th-century BC disestablishments
23rd-century BC establishments